Inspector Sergil (French: Inspecteur Sergil) is a 1947 French crime film directed by Jacques Daroy and starring Paul Meurisse and Liliane Bert. It is set in Marseilles. It was a popular success and was followed by two sequels Sergil and the Dictator and Sergil Among the Girls.

The film's sets were designed by the art director Claude Bouxin.

Cast
 Paul Meurisse as Inspecteur Pierre Sergil  
 Liliane Bert as Bijou  
 André Burgère as Jacques Saugères  
 Véra Maxime as Nadège  
 Marc Valbel as Stan  
 Pierre Clarel as Georges Martel  
 Dora Doll as Sandra Grégoriff  
 René Blancard as Goujon 
 Henri Arius as Le concierge  
 Louis Florencie as Le commissaire  
 Fransined as Un policier  
 Jérôme Goulven as Monnier  
 Raymond Loyer as Le commandant  
 Victoria Marino as La chanteuse

References

Bibliography 
 Marcelline Block. World Film Locations: Marseilles. Intellect Books, 2013.

External links 
 

1947 films
French crime films
1947 crime films
1940s French-language films
Films directed by Jacques Daroy
Films set in Marseille
French black-and-white films
1940s French films